Alvin J. Redford (August 25, 1883 – 1974) was an American law enforcement officer and politician.

Born in Pewaukee, Wisconsin, Redford served as a city police officer. He also served as Sheriff of Waukesha County, Wisconsin and deputy sheriff. Redford served in the Wisconsin State Assembly during the 1949, 1951, 1953, 1955 and 1957 sessions and was a Republican.

Notes

1883 births
1974 deaths
People from Pewaukee, Wisconsin
Wisconsin sheriffs
Republican Party members of the Wisconsin State Assembly
20th-century American politicians